The Archaeopteridales are an extinct order of plants belonging to Progymnospermae, and dominant forest trees of the Late Devonian. They reproduced with spores rather than seeds.

References

Middle Devonian plants
Prehistoric plant orders
Late Devonian plants
Middle Devonian first appearances
Late Devonian extinctions